The 2017–18 UAE League Cup is the 10th season of the UAE League Cup. The competition started on September 4, 2017.

Group stage

Group A

Group B

Group matches
All times are local (UTC+04:00).

Group A

Group B

Knockout phase
The knockout phase involves the first four teams of each of the 2 groups in the group stage.

Each tie in the knockout phase, apart from the final, is played over two legs, with each team playing one leg at home. The team that scores more goals on aggregate over the two legs advance to the next round. If the aggregate score is level, the away goals rule is applied, i.e. the team that scored more goals away from home over the two legs advances. If away goals are also equal, then thirty minutes of extra time is played. The away goals rule is again applied after extra time, i.e. if there are goals scored during extra time and the aggregate score is still level, the visiting team advances by virtue of more away goals scored. If no goals are scored during extra time, the tie is decided by penalty shoot-out. In the final, which is played as a single match, if scores are level at the end of normal time, extra time is played, followed by penalty shoot-out if scores remain tied.

Quarter-finals
The first legs was played on 29 and 30 December 2017, and the second legs will be played on 15 and 16 February 2018.

First leg

Second leg

Semi-finals
The semi-finals will be played on 9 and 22 March 2018.

First leg

Second leg

Final
The final will be played on 29 March 2018.

Goalscorers

There have been 22 goals scored in 8 matches, for an average of  goals per match.

6 goals

 Sebastián Tagliabué (Al Wahda)
 Caio (Al-Wasl)

5 goals

 Douglas (Al Ain)
 Welliton (Al-Sharjah)

4 goals

 Caio (Al Ain)

3 goals

 Sebastián Sáez (Emirates)
 Marcelo Cirino (Al-Nasr Dubai)
 Henrique Luvannor (Shabab Al-Ahli Dubai)
 Makhete Diop (Shabab Al-Ahli Dubai)
 Ahmed Al Ghilani (Al Jazira)
 Mohamed Al-Akbari (Al Wahda)

2 goals

 Ronaldo Mendes (Al-Wasl)
 Ciel (Dibba Al-Fujairah)
 Wanderley (Al-Nasr Dubai)
 Samuel Rosa Gonçalves (Hatta)
 Fábio Virginio de Lima (Al-Wasl)
 Alassane Diallo (Dibba Al-Fujairah)
 Moon Chang-jin (Shabab Al-Ahli Dubai)
 Hassan Mohammed (Al-Wasl)
 Ahmed Rashed Ali (Dibba Al-Fujairah)
 Yousef Ahmed (Al Ain)
 Saeed Al-Kathiri (Al Dhafra)
 Salem Saleh (Al-Nasr Dubai
 Khalid Rashid Alzari (Al-Sharjah)
 Sardor Rashidov (Al Jazira)
 Tareq Ahmed (Al Wahda)

1 goal

 Romarinho (Al Jazira)
 Mohannad Abdul-Raheem (Al Dhafra)
 Abdelghani Mouaoui (Emirates)
 Makhete Diop (Shabab Al-Ahli Dubai)
 Mohsen Abdullah (Al Ain)
 Mahir Jasem (Hatta)
 Jassem Yaqoub (Al-Nasr Dubai)
 Abdullah Abdulqader (Al Dhafra)
 Hussain Abdulrahman (Ajman Club)
 Mohammed Abdulbasit (Al Wahda)
 Ahmed Khalil (Al Ain)
 Mourad Batna (Al Wahda)

References

External links
Arabian Gulf Cup official website

UAE League Cup seasons
2017–18 Asian domestic association football cups